Oley may refer to:

People
 Barnabas Oley (1602–1686), English churchman and academic
 Johann Christoph Oley (1738–1789), German organist and composer

Places
 Oley Valley, Pennsylvania
 Oley Township, Berks County, Pennsylvania
 Oley, Pennsylvania, a census-designated place within this township

Other
 OleY, acronym for L-olivosyl-oleandolide 3-O-methyltransferase, an enzyme
 Oley, a car brand